{{Taxobox
| name = 'Triplofusus princeps| image =
| image_caption =
| regnum = Animalia
| phylum = Mollusca
| classis = Gastropoda
| unranked_superfamilia = clade Caenogastropodaclade Hypsogastropodaclade Neogastropoda
| superfamilia = Buccinoidea
| familia = Fasciolariidae
| subfamilia =
| genus = Triplofusus| species = T. princeps| binomial = Triplofusus princeps| binomial_authority = (G.B. Sowerby I, 1825) 
| synonyms_ref = 
| synonyms =
 Fasciolaria acutispsira Strebel, 1911
 Fasciolaria princeps G.B. Sowerby I, 1825 (original combination)
 Pleuroploca acutispira (Strebel, 1911)
 Pleuroploca princeps (G.B. Sowerby I, 1825)
}}Triplofusus princeps is a species of sea snail, a marine gastropod mollusk in the family Fasciolariidae, the spindle snails, the tulip snails and their allies.

Description

Distribution

References

 Petit R.E. (2009) George Brettingham Sowerby, I, II & III: their conchological publications and molluscan taxa. Zootaxa 2189: 1–218
 Snyder M.A., Vermeij G.J. & Lyons W.G. (2012) The genera and biogeography of Fasciolariinae (Gastropoda, Neogastropoda, Fasciolariida''e). Basteria 76(1-3): 31–70.

External links

Fasciolariidae
Gastropods described in 1825